Melody Maker is the nineteenth studio album by South African musician Hugh Masekela. It was recorded in Silver Spring, Maryland, and Fairfax, Virginia, and released in 1976 via Casablanca Records label. Songs "Toejam" and "Hi-Life" were re-released on CD in 1998 on Verve Records as part of The Boy's Doin' It album.

Reception
A reviewer of Dusty Groove stated: "Hats off to Hugh Masekela – one of the few artists who could record for the Casablanca label and never manage to lose his own sense of sound and spirit! The album's a surprisingly great one, filled with the kinds of subtle touches and earthy soul we've always loved in Hugh's music – certainly a bit more polished than before, given the date of the record, but still filled with some really personal, individual moments. The set begins with a beautiful long instrumental titled 'Hi Life' – with Hugh blowing a long, lean solo over the top of a mellow groove – then it moves into a range of shorter numbers, both vocal and instrumental, including the funk track 'Toe Jam', plus the cuts 'Come On Home', 'Melodi', 'I'll Make You Feel Alright', 'Melody Maker', and 'Dance'."

Track listing

Personnel
Isaak Asante – percussion
Richard Neesai Botchway – guitar
Eka-Ete – vocals
Adaloja Gboyega  – composer, keyboards
Stewart Levine  – engineer, producer
Hugh Masekela  – composer, horn, producer
Yaw Opoku – bass, composer
Papa Frankie Todd  – drums
Stanley Todd  – guitar, organ, vocals

References

External links

1976 albums
Hugh Masekela albums
Albums produced by Stewart Levine
Casablanca Records albums